Singburi Province Stadium is a multi-purpose stadium in Sing Buri Province, Thailand. It is currently used mostly for football matches and is the home stadium of Singburi F.C. The stadium holds 3,449 people.

Multi-purpose stadiums in Thailand